ASA Aluminium Body is an Argentinian company that produces exact replicas of racing cars from the 1930s, 1940s and 1950s. The company is headquartered in Don Torcuato, a city in Tigre Partido.

History 
In 1969 a company named Lotus Argentina started producing licensed Lotus Seven roadsters. In 1985 Néstor Salerno, an Argentinian racing driver, bought the company, changing its name to ASA ("Automóvil Sport Argentino").

Current models
The company offers standard replicas of Lotus Seven and Porsche 550. Also offered are special order replicas of cars like: Maserati 300S, Lancia D24, Ferrari 375 MM, Alfa Romeo 3000 CM, Frazer Nash Le Mans and other racing cars from the period. All of the cars have aluminium bodies.

References

External links
 
 Néstor Salerno interview on ElTreceTV.com

1969 establishments in Argentina
Car manufacturers of Argentina